Danna Stern is the former head of Yes Studios.

Career
Stern studied at Tel Aviv University and the Kellogg School of Management. 
Stern worked as a news producer for Israeli Army Radio and then spent six year with Reuters Television in Jerusalem. In 1999 she joined yes TV as an acquisitions executive working her way up to vice president and in 2017 became managing director of Yes Studios. During her tenure, Fauda was the first show in Hebrew to get picked up by Netflix.  Stern is a member of the International Academy of Television Arts and Sciences.

In 2023, Stern was selected to be on the international jury of the inaugural Berlinale Series Award at 73rd Berlin International Film Festival.

Personal
Stern's husband is Israeli journalist and TV anchor, Dov Gil-har. They have three children.

References

Living people
20th-century Israeli businesspeople
21st-century Israeli businesspeople
Jewish women in business
21st-century Israeli Jews
Israeli Jews
Israeli film producers
Year of birth missing (living people)